In Greek mythology, Zeuxippus  (Ancient Greek: Ζεύξιππος) was the successor of Phaestus as king of Sicyon and in turn succeeded by Hippolytus, grandson of the former ruler.

Family 
Zeuxippus was the son of Apollo and the nymph Syllis (or Hyllis, daughter of Hyllus and Iole).

Mythology 
Zeuxippus only appeared in the account of Pausanias' Description of Greece:

After Phaestus in obedience to an oracle migrated to Crete, the next king is said to have been Zeuxippus, the son of Apollo and the nymph Syllis. On the death of Zeuxippus, Agamemnon led an army against Sicyon and king Hippolytus, the son of Rhopalus, the son of Phaestus.

Citations

General and cited references 
 Pausanias, Description of Greece with an English Translation by W.H.S. Jones, Litt.D., and H.A. Ormerod, M.A., in 4 Volumes. Cambridge, MA, Harvard University Press; London, William Heinemann Ltd. 1918. . Online version at the Perseus Digital Library
 Pausanias, Graeciae Descriptio. 3 vols. Leipzig, Teubner. 1903.  Greek text available at the Perseus Digital Library.

Children of Apollo
Demigods in classical mythology
Kings in Greek mythology
Mythological kings of Sicyon
Mythology of Sicyon
Sicyonian characters in Greek mythology